is a Japanese suitmaker, stuntman, sculptor, modeler, and film director. He is particularly well known for his work in giant monster films, including Mothra (1961), King Kong vs. Godzilla (1962), and The Mighty Peking Man (1977).

Career
In 1958, Toho hired Murase to sculpt the Varan suit for Varan the Unbelievable. An amateur photographer, Murase extensively documented his work which was published in his 2015 autobiography, Monster Maker: Keizo Murase. After working for Daiei Film on Gamera, he, Masao Yagi, and Akira Suzuki founded the modelling company, Ex Productions, he later left in 1972 to form his own company, Twenty.

Filmography

Film 

 The H-Man (1958)
 Varan (1958) - Varan sculptor / Miniature construction
 Mothra (1961) - Mothra imago sculptor
 King Kong vs. Godzilla (1962) - King Kong and Godzilla sculptor
 Gorath (1962) - Maguma sculptor
 Matango (1963) - Matango sculptor
 Mothra vs. Godzilla (1964) - Godzilla sculptor
 Dogora (1964) - Dogora sculptor
 Ghidorah, the Three-Headed Monster (1964) - Godzilla and King Ghidorah sculptor
 Frankenstein Conquers the World (1965) - Frankenstein and Baragon sculptor
 Gamera (1965) - Gamera sculptor
 Return of Daimajin (1966) - Daimajin sculptor
 Daimajin Strikes Again (1966) - Daimajin sculptor
 Gamera vs. Gyaos (1967) - Gyaos sculptor
 Yongary, Monster from the Deep (1967) - Yonggary sculptor
 Gamera vs. Viras (1968) - Viras sculptor
 Terror of Mechagodzilla (1975)
 The Mighty Peking Man (1977) - Peking Man sculptor
 The Seventh Curse (1986)
 Godzilla vs. King Ghidorah (1991) - King Ghidorah and Mecha-King Ghidorah sculptor
 Godzilla vs. Mothra (1992)
 Howl from Beyond the Fog (2019)
 Brush of the God (2023) - Director

Television 

 Kamen Rider (1971)
 Ultraman Ace (1972)
 Ike! Greenman (TV 1973–1974) - Greenman sculptor

References

External links 

 

1933 births
People from Hokkaido
Special effects people
Godzilla (franchise)
Living people